In statistics, the q-Weibull distribution is a probability distribution that generalizes the Weibull distribution and the Lomax distribution (Pareto Type II). It is one example of a Tsallis distribution.

Characterization

Probability density function
The probability density function of a q-Weibull random variable is:

where q < 2,  > 0 are shape parameters and λ > 0 is the scale parameter of the distribution and

is the q-exponential

Cumulative distribution function
The cumulative distribution function of a q-Weibull random variable is:

where

Mean
The mean of the q-Weibull distribution is

The expression for the mean is a continuous function of q over the range of definition for which it is finite.

Relationship to other distributions
The q-Weibull is equivalent to the Weibull distribution when q = 1 and equivalent to the q-exponential when 

The q-Weibull is a generalization of the Weibull, as it extends this distribution to the cases of finite support (q < 1) and to include heavy-tailed distributions .

The q-Weibull is a generalization of the Lomax distribution (Pareto Type II), as it extends this distribution to the cases of finite support and adds the  parameter. The Lomax parameters are:

When q > 1, the q-exponential is equivalent to the Pareto shifted to have support starting at zero. Specifically:

See also 

 Constantino Tsallis
 Tsallis statistics
 Tsallis entropy
 Tsallis distribution
 q-Gaussian

References 

Statistical mechanics
Continuous distributions
Probability distributions with non-finite variance